Burrowes is a surname. Notable people with the name include:

 David Burrowes (born 1969), British politician
 Brian Burrowes (1896–1963), bishop in the Scottish Episcopal Church
 Patricia Burrowes (born 1961), American herpetologist
 Peter Burrowes (1753–1841), Irish barrister and politician
 Robert Burrowes (disambiguation), several people
 Thomas Burrowes (disambiguation), several people
 Tim Burrowes, founder of Mumbrella magazine and website
 Wesley Burrowes (1930–2015), Irish playwright and screenwriter

See also
 Burroughs (surname)
 Burrow (surname)
 Burrows (surname)